The Wilmington Clippers were a professional American football team that played from 1937 to 1942, and from 1946 to 1949. They were based in the American Association from 1939 to 1941, later returning for the 1946 to 1949 seasons. They were located in Wilmington, Delaware. The Clippers played as an independent team from 1937 to 1938, and in 1942.

Independent
Wilmington was an independent team from 1937–1938. In 1937, the team had NFL Hall of Fame coach Vince Lombardi on their roster. Their record in 1937 was 5–4. Their record in 1938 was 10–2.

American Association/AFL
1939 Season

In 1939, the Clippers joined the American Association. The team included Jack Ferrante, an End who led the league in touchdowns. The Wilmington Clippers finished the season with 9 wins, 3 losses, and a tie. They made the playoffs but lost to the Newark Bears, 13–6 (Wilmington protested the use of Sid Luckman who owner George Halas sent in for the Newark Bears because he had been with the Chicago Bears all season).

1940 Season

In 1940, the Clippers finished with a 5–4–1 record which was enough to make the playoffs. In the semifinals they beat the Paterson Panthers 11–8. There were 2 safeties in that game, one scored by each team. Then they made the championship but lost 17–7 against the Jersey City Giants.

1941 Season

In 1941 the Wilmington Clippers finished with a 4–3–2 record, which was 3rd in the league. They had Offensive Guard Ed Michaels who made the All-Star team for the 3rd year in a row. They played the Paterson Panthers again in the semifinals, and won 33–0. Then in the championship they won 21–13 against the 8–2 Long Island Indians. In the game Jack Ferrante had 2 touchdowns.

1942 Season

The 1942 American Association was cancelled due to World War II, but the Clippers kept playing, they were an independent team for that year. In 1942 they went 8–0–1. Their tie game was an exhibition match against the Philadelphia Eagles.

1943–1945

Then in 1943 because of World War II, they did not play, and they would not return to playing until 1946.

1946 Season

In the 1946 season the American Association continued but was renamed the American Football League. The team had their worst season in 1946, finishing with only a 1–7–2 record.

1947 Season

In 1947, the Wilmington Clippers finished with a 2–5–1 record and missed the playoffs. They had 3 time All-Star Ed Michaels return and be named to a 4th All-Star. 

1948 Season

In the 1948 season, they finished with a 5–4–1 record, they made the playoffs and beat the Richmond Rebels to make the championship. However the Wilmington Clippers lost in the championship, 14–24 against the Paterson Panthers.

1949 Season

The 1949 season was their last season, and they finished the year with a 5–5 record. They lost 66–0 in the semifinals against the Richmond Rebels, and that would be their final game because they dropped out of the league the next year. They were replaced by a team called the Brooklyn Brooks.

Stadium
The Clippers played at Wilmington Park. From 1937 to 1939 they played at Pennsy Field.

References

External links
 1937 Roster and Schedule 1937 Wilmington Clippers - Pro Football Archives
 1938 Roster and Schedule 1938 Wilmington Clippers - Pro Football Archives
 1939 Roster and Schedule 1939 Wilmington Clippers - Pro Football Archives
 1940 Roster and Schedule 1940 Wilmington Clippers - Pro Football Archives
 1941 Roster and Schedule 1941 Wilmington Clippers - Pro Football Archives
 1942 Roster and Schedule 1942 Wilmington Clippers - Pro Football Archives
 1946 Roster and Schedule 1946 Wilmington Clippers - Pro Football Archives
 1947 Roster and Schedule 1947 Wilmington Clippers - Pro Football Archives
 1948 Roster and Schedule 1948 Wilmington Clippers - Pro Football Archives
 1949 Roster and Schedule 1949 Wilmington Clippers - Pro Football Archives

American football teams disestablished in 1950
American football teams established in 1937
American football teams in Delaware
Wilmington Clippers
1937 establishments in Delaware
1950 disestablishments in Delaware